Sen Anlat Karadeniz (English title: Tell me about the Black Sea) is a Turkish drama television series, starring Ulaş Tuna Astepe, İrem Helvacıoğlu, Mehmet Ali Nuroğlu, Sinan Tuzcu and Öykürman. It premiered on ATV on January 24, 2018.

Due to its violent sex scenes, several complaints were sent to RTÜK to stop the series' broadcast.

Plot 

Nefes was only 16 years old when she was sold to a rich abusive man, Vedat Sayar, under the name of "marriage". Nefes had a tough life and had been locked up in house, tortured for 8 years long in Vedat’s mansion in Istanbul. In her 25th attempt, Nefes manages to escape from the "living hell" with her 7 years old son, Yigit, who was a result of a rape. Her escape was a complete coincidence that happened during a visit of a small town, cultural family from The Black Sea region. One of the sons, Tahir, who didn't know Nefes and her son are hiding in his car trunk, discovers that when he arrives to his home country, Trabzon, that is 562 miles away. As a man born and raised in the Black Sea Region, Tahir is ready to give his life for any person treated unjustly. Tahir sacrifices himself to save Nefes and her son. While doing so, he faces many challenges including exposing himself and his family to the threat of Nefes' kidnapper, who was also known as her abuser, Vedat, as well as the rejection of his family and his country to Nefes; as protecting a "married" woman with a child is considered "against traditions" in his hometown.

Cast 
 Ulaş Tuna Astepe as Tahir Kaleli; Nefes' husband and Yiğit's and Masal father 
 İrem Helvacıoğlu  as Nefes Kaleli / Nefes Zorlu; Tahir's wife, Vedat's former victim and Yiğit's and Masal mother
 Mehmet Ali Nuroğlu as Vedat Sayar / Vedat Deliçay; Nefes' kidnapper/abuser, Nazar's former husband and abuser and Yiğit's biological father
 Sinan Tuzcu as Mustafa Kaleli; Saniye’s eldest son, Asiye's husband and Balım's father
 Ali Ersan Duru as Ferhat
 Gözde Kansu as Eyşan Sayar; Vedat's cousin
 Öykü Gürman as Asiye Kaleli; Mustafa's wife and Balım's mother
 Sait Genay as Osman Hopalı; the imam, Asiye's father, Nefes' father-figure and Esma's father 
 Nurşim Demir as Saniye Kaleli; Mustafa,  Murat and Fatih's mother
 Cem Kenar as Murat Kaleli; Saniye's twin son and Nazar's love interest 
 Furkan Aksoy as Fatih Kaleli; Saniye's twin son and Berrak's love interest
 İlayda Çevik as Berrak Yilmaz; Fatih's love interest and Necip's daughter 
 Belfu Benian as Mercan Dağdeviren; Cemil and Türkan's eldest daughter, Nazar's older sister and Tahir's ex fiancée 
 Çağla Özavcı as Nazar Dağdeviren / Sayar; Cemil and Türkan's youngest daughter, Mercan's younger sister, Vedat's former wife and Murat's lover
 Hilmi Özçelik as Cemil Dağdeviren; Mercan and Nazar's father
 Nalan Kuruçim as Türkan Dağdeviren; Mercan and Nazar's mother
 Şendoğan Öksüz as Cemal Reis; Tahir's assistant/helper
 Emre Ön as İdris; Nuran's husband and family friend of Kalelis
 Faruk Acar as Necip; Vedat's right hand man and Berrak’s father
 Demir Birinci as Yiğit Kaleli; Nefes and Vedat’s son, Tahir's adoptive son  
 Dilek Aktaş as Balım Kaleli; Mustafa and Asiye's daughter
 Senem Göktürk as Nuran; Idris’s wife and family friend of the Kalelis
 Duygu Üstünbaş as Esma Hopalı; a lawyer, Osman's niece, Asiye's cousin and Ali's lover and wife 
 Mehmet Çepiç as Commissioner Mithat Bozok; Chief police of Trabzon
 Can Verel as Doctor Volkan Darici; Nefes and Mercan's doctor 
 Temmuz Gürkan Karaca as Ali; Tahir's friend and Esma's husband
 Uğur Çavuşoğlu as Genco
 Emine Türkyılmaz as Ceylan; Berrak's younger sister 
 Dilek Denizdelen as Naciye; Neighbour of the Kalelis
 Erdal Cindoruk as Fikret Deliçay

Series overview

Awards and nominations

International broadcasts

References

External links 
  

Turkish drama television series
ATV (Turkey) original programming
2018 Turkish television series debuts
Turkish-language television shows
Television shows set in Istanbul
Television series produced in Istanbul
Television series set in the 2010s